The TVR S series, a line of sports cars, was announced at the 1986 British International Motor Show. Due to a massive positive response, the car went into production in less than 12 months, with 250 pre-manufacture orders. This was Peter Wheeler's first major development since buying the company from Martin Lilley, and the turning point in TVR's fortunes.

Between 1986 and 1994, TVR produced 2,604 S-series cars; 410 of these were the V8S model.

S1/S2/S3(C)/S4C
 The V6 S-series cars used Ford's Cologne V6 in 2.8 L, 160 hp (S1) and 2.9 L, 170 hp (S2–S4) forms. The early "S" cars are often referred to as "S1", to distinguish them from later versions. The S3 and S4 models were fitted with longer doors, although some late S2 cars also had these. The S3c and S4c had catalytic converters.

S1s are becoming increasingly rare with only 78 licensed and 224 SORN.

Model names ending with "c" were used to denote vehicles fitted with a catalytic converter. Only the S3 and S4 were available with catalysts (and the S4 was not built without them). A catalytic converter standard in the UK was only introduced in August 1992, at "K" registration; catalyzed earlier cars were intended for export to markets with tighter emissions standards.

V8S
The standard specification of the V8S included ½ hide leather interior, walnut trim, mohair hood, OZ alloy wheels, driving lamps, electric windows and door mirrors.

The V8S contains a 4.0 L fuel-injected Rover V8 engine, with gas-flowed cylinder heads, higher lift camshaft, compression ratio upped to 10:5:1, revised manifold, new chip for the engine management system and a limited slip differential.

The V8S has a number of cosmetic differences over the V6. The bonnet has a large hump - created to house the Italian specification supercharger but carried over to all V8S models.

The V8S has a small vent facing the windscreen, whereas S1 to S3 models face forward. Very late S3 and S4 models had no hump at all. As with all TVRs there is no specific point in time when they changed styles; changes were gradually introduced as parts ran out.

The suspension track is slightly wider on the V8S achieved with revised wishbones at the front and revised trailing arms at the rear. Disc brakes are fitted all round.

0-60 mph could be achieved in 4.9 seconds and 0-100 mph in 12.9 seconds. It was faster than an Aston Martin Virage, a Ferrari Testarossa, Lotus Esprit Turbo SE, typical supercars of the early 1990s.

2-litre V8S
The TVR 2-litre V8S was a 2-litre supercharged version of the V8S - this was created for the Italian market in response to their car taxation based on engine capacity. The engine was a modified 3.5 litre Rover V8 fitted with a smaller-throw crank to reduce the engine capacity, retaining the 88.9 mm bore but with a short stroke of 40.25 mm. Lucas electronic fuel injection was fitted, along with an intercooled Eaton supercharger. Ventilated disc brakes were fitted up front, and the 2-litre V8 also got adjustable ride height hydraulic shocks. Currently, only one example is known to have been built.

References

S series
Sports cars
Automobiles with backbone chassis
Cars introduced in 1986
1990s cars